Minister for Transport and Infrastructure may refer to:

 Minister for Infrastructure and Transport (Australia)
 Minister for Transport and Infrastructure (New South Wales), a former position in the Government of New South Wales, Australia
 Minister for Transport and Infrastructure (Scotland), a former position in the Scottish Government
 Minister for Transport and Infrastructure (Victoria), a position in the Cabinet of Victoria, Australia
 Minister of Infrastructure and Transport (Italy)
 Minister of Transport and Infrastructure (Romania)